Mirificarma ulicinella is a moth of the family Gelechiidae. It is found in Portugal, Spain, France and Italy.

The wingspan is 5.5-6.5 mm for males and 5–6 mm for females. The head is ochreous cream. The forewings are mottled dark and light brown with paler yellow-ochre areas. Adults are on wing from August to September in one generation per year.

The larvae feed on Ulex parviflorus. They feed from within the flowers. Larvae can be found from October to April. Pupation takes place at the base of the plant in a shell of dried leaves

References

Moths described in 1859
Mirificarma
Moths of Europe